Poplar Grove may refer to places in the United States: 

(by state)
Poplar Grove, Illinois
Poplar Grove, Howard County, Indiana, an unincorporated community
Poplar Grove, Indianapolis, a neighborhood of Indianapolis
Poplar Grove (Lexington, Kentucky), listed on the NRHP in Fayette County, Kentucky
Poplar Grove Plantation (Louisiana), Port Allen, Louisiana, listed on the NRHP in Louisiana
Poplar Grove Township, Roseau County, Minnesota
Poplar Grove (Scotts Hill, North Carolina), listed on the NRHP in North Carolina
Poplar Grove, Salt Lake City, Utah, a neighborhood in Salt Lake City
Poplar Grove National Cemetery in Petersburg, Virginia
Poplar Grove Mill and House, Williams, Virginia, listed on the NRHP in Virginia

See also
 Battle of Poplar Grove (1900), a battle of the Second Boer War